Elizabeth Arden (born Florence Nightingale Graham; December 31, 1881 – October 18, 1966) was a Canadian-American businesswoman who founded what is now Elizabeth Arden, Inc., and built a cosmetics empire in the United States. By 1929, she owned 150 salons in Europe and the United States. Her 1,000 products were being sold in 22 countries. She was the sole owner, and at the peak of her career, she was one of the wealthiest women in the world.

Background
Arden was born on New Year's Eve, 1881, on her family's farm in Woodbridge, Ontario, Canada. The property is currently home to the Vaughan Grove community. Her parents had emigrated to Canada from Cornwall, United Kingdom, in the 1870s. Her father, William Graham, was Scottish, and her mother, Susan (Tadd), was Cornish and had arranged for a wealthy aunt in Cornwall to pay for her children's education. Arden dropped out of nursing school in Toronto.

She then joined her elder brother in Manhattan, working briefly as a bookkeeper for the E. R. Squibb Pharmaceuticals Company. While there, Arden spent hours in their lab, learning about skincare. She then worked—again briefly—for Eleanor Adair, an early beauty culturist, as a "treatment girl".

In her salons and through her marketing campaigns, Elizabeth Arden stressed teaching women how to apply makeup and pioneered such concepts as scientific formulation of cosmetics, beauty makeovers, and coordinating colors of eye, lip and facial makeup.

Elizabeth Arden was largely responsible for establishing makeup as proper and appropriate, even necessary, for a ladylike image, when before makeup had often been associated with lower classes and prostitutes. She targeted middle age and plain women for whom beauty products promised a youthful, beautiful image.

Arden was allegedly a dedicated suffragette, and there is a story that she marched for women's rights in 1912. It is a popular fiction that she supplied the marchers with red lipstick as a sign of solidarity, but there is little contemporary evidence supporting this. Women taking part in the 1912 march were advised to wear the same $7 straw hat, wear white, and to bring their children, to demonstrate their responsibility and simplicity. The use of cosmetics was never mentioned, which is hardly surprising: bold red lipstick still had tawdry associations with the theatre. Even as late as 1920 Arden herself was dismissive of "powder and rouge..so obvious in their artifice that their use was considered in questionable taste".

Career

In 1909, Arden formed a partnership with Elizabeth Hubbard, another culturist. The business relationship dissolved in 1910. Graham, who desired a trade name, used "Elizabeth" to save money on her salon signs. She chose the last name, "Arden", from a nearby farm. So the trade name "Elizabeth Arden" was formed. From there, Arden founded, in 1910, the Red Door salon in New York, which has remained synonymous with her name ever since (see under Elizabeth Arden, Inc.).

In 1912, Arden traveled to France to learn beauty and facial massage techniques used in the Paris beauty salons. She returned with a collection of rouges and tinted powders she had created. She began expanding her international operations in 1915 and started opening salons across the world. In 1934, she opened the Maine Chance residential spa in Rome, Maine, the first destination beauty spa in the United States. It operated until 1970.

In 1962, the French government awarded Arden the Légion d'Honneur, in recognition of her contribution to the cosmetics industry.

Horse racing

Elizabeth Arden was involved in the sport of Thoroughbred racing for many years. Her stable, Maine Chance Farm (named for her spa), owned--among other stakes winners--the 1947 Kentucky Derby winner Jet Pilot.

Death
Arden died at Lenox Hill Hospital in Manhattan on October 18, 1966. She was interred in the Sleepy Hollow Cemetery in Sleepy Hollow, New York, under the name Elizabeth N. Graham.

In popular culture
The musical War Paint dramatizes her rivalry with competitor Helena Rubinstein. After a successful tryout at Chicago's Goodman Theater, the show opened on Broadway at the Nederlander Theatre on April 6, 2017, earning four Tony Award nominations, including Best Actress in a Leading Role for Christine Ebersole's portrayal of Arden as well as for Patti Lupone for her role as rival, Rubinstein.  and closed on November 5, 2017.

The comedy Lip Service by the Australian dramatist John Misto chronicles the life and career of Helena Rubinstein and her rivalry with Elizabeth Arden and Revlon. Lip Service premiered April 26, 2017, at the Park Theatre in London, under the title Madame Rubinstein, before opening at Sydney's Ensemble Theatre in August of the same year.

Elizabeth Arden, as student nurse Florence Nightingale Graham, appeared in the Season 12 Episode 2 of the CBC period drama Murdoch Mysteries, (premiered on October 1, 2018), portrayed by Kathryn Alexandre.

A contract dispute that Arden faced with a former employee led the 1953 court cause Crabtree v. Elizabeth Arden Sales Corp, which is now considered a seminal case on the application of the statute of frauds. Most law schools include this case in their required contract law course.

References

General references

Further reading

External links
 Elizabeth Arden at Elizabeth Arden, Inc.
 Elizabeth Arden  at Elizabeth Arden, Inc. corporate
 
 FBI dossier on Elizabeth Arden

1881 births
1966 deaths
American cosmetics businesspeople
American people of Cornish descent
American people of English descent
American people of Scottish descent
American racehorse owners and breeders
American women in business
Burials at Sleepy Hollow Cemetery
Businesspeople from Ontario
Canadian emigrants to the United States
Canadian Horse Racing Hall of Fame inductees
Canadian people of Cornish descent
Canadian people of English descent
Canadian people of Scottish descent
Cosmetics people
History of cosmetics
Recipients of the Legion of Honour
People from Vaughan